Swagatham (English: Welcome) is a 1989 Indian Malayalam film, directed by Venu Nagavally and produced by Anand. The film stars Jayaram, Urvasi, Ashokan and Parvathy in the lead roles. The film has musical score by Rajamani.

Plot

The story revolves around Ramaswamy and younger sister Veni. There is a group of friends surrounding them, including Sudhi, Sajan and siblings Tito and Fifi. Fifi is in love with Sajan while Tito and Veni secretly love each other.

Ramaswamy is utterly dismayed when Veni elopes with Tito. He fails to accept the relationship as Tito is from another religion and considers it a deception. Tito's family accepts the couple and Tito leaves to the Middle east for work.

In the meantime, Sajan leaves Fifi for another girl. It turns out that Fifi is pregnant with his child. The family gets the pregnancy terminated secretly to avoid the shame it brings.

To the shock of everyone, Tito dies in the Middle east  when Veni is pregnant. This leaves Veni mentally disturbed and Ramaswamy comes back to support his ailing sister. Veni's condition improves in the care of Fifi and Ramaswamy. Ramaswamy is moved by the compassion Fifi shows towards Veni. The story ends with Ramaswamy inviting Fifi to his life.

Cast
 
Jayaram as Ramaswamy Krishnmoorthy
Urvasi as Filomina Francis aka Fifi
Ashokan as Tito Francis
Parvathy Jayaram as Veni Krishnamoorthy
Nedumudi Venu as Devan Nair
M. G. Soman as Major Francis
Sulakshana as Betty
Sreenath as Sajan
Jagathy Sreekumar as Sudhi
Ajayan Adoor as Freddy
Innocent as Chef Felix Stanislaus Labrador
Sukumari as Daisy Aunty
Adoor Pankajam as Mrs. Pillai
Bahadoor as Chellappan Pillai
Jagadish as Hirosh
Jagannathan as Vallabhai
Ravi Vallathol as Johney
Kollam Thulasi as Johney's Father
Mamukkoya as Mamukka

Soundtrack
The music was composed by Rajamani.

References

External links
  
 

1989 films
1980s Malayalam-language films